Adnan Kevrić (born 2 May 1970) is a Bosnian former professional footballer who played as a midfielder. He was the manager of Eintracht Trier between October 2006 and March 2007.

Club career
Bundesliga in 1993. Kevrić spent seven years at Kickers and was the DFB-Pokal top scorer for the 1999–2000 season. He spent the 2000–01 season with SSV Ulm 1846 before joining Eintracht Trier of the Regionalliga Süd in summer 2001. Despite suffering a torn cruciate ligament in September 2001, he was promoted to the 2. Bundesliga with Trier in his first season at the club and became club captain. However, he left the club at the end of the 2003–04 season after falling out with manager Paul Linz and subsequently had spells playing at FC Nöttingen, SpVgg Ludwigsburg and TV Nellingen.

International career
Kevrić was capped twice by the Bosnia and Herzegovina national team. His first appearance for Bosnia and Herzegovina came on 14 May 1998 in a 5–0 defeat to Argentina, before his second came on 24 January 2000 in a 2–0 defeat to Qatar.

Managerial career
After Eintract Trier suffered a second consecutive relegation in the 2005–06 season to the Oberliga, Kevrić took up the role of sporting director at Eintracht. He took up the role of manager at the club in October 2006 before leaving his role at the club in March 2007.

Style of play
Kevrić played as a playmaker.

Personal life
Kevrić's daughter Helen is a gymnast. Since retiring from football, Kevrić worked as a financial advisor, before talking up roles for Daimler AG in Untertürkheim and TuS Stuttgart.

Career statistics

Club

International

References

External links

Adnan Kevrić at kickersarchiv.de 
Adnan Kevrić at Football Association of Bosnia and Herzegovina

Living people
1970 births
People from Brčko District
Bosnia and Herzegovina footballers
Bosnia and Herzegovina international footballers
Association football midfielders
SV Eintracht Trier 05 managers
Stuttgarter Kickers players
SSV Ulm 1846 players
SV Eintracht Trier 05 players
FC Nöttingen players
Offenburger FV players
SpVgg Ludwigsburg players
2. Bundesliga players
Regionalliga players
Oberliga (football) players
Yugoslav emigrants to West Germany
German people of Bosnia and Herzegovina descent
West German footballers
German footballers